Vincenzo Giustiniani (August 1516, Chios – 28 October 1582 Rome) was an Italian-Greek Dominican friar of Genoese heritage.

He was Master General of the order from 1558 to 1570. He was elevated to Cardinal of S. Nicola fra le Immagini in the consistory of 17 May 1570.

References 

1516 births
1582 deaths
Greek cardinals
Greek Dominicans
16th-century Italian cardinals
Cardinals created by Pope Pius V
Italian Dominicans
Clergy from Chios
Masters of the Order of Preachers
Dominican cardinals